Mas Dam, is an earthfill dam on the Mas river near Khamgaon, Buldhana district  in the Indian State of Maharashtra.  It is largely used for irrigation purposes.

Specifications

See also
 Dams in Maharashtra
 List of reservoirs and dams in India

References

Dams in Buldhana district
Dams completed in 1932
1932 establishments in India
20th-century architecture in India